OPAR L'Orientale Open Archive is the institutional repository of the University of Naples "L'Orientale", designed according to the  Berlin Declaration on Open Access to Knowledge in Science and Humanities and the  Messina Declaration ratified by CRUI in 2004.
OPAR L'Orientale Open Archive is a digital repository, accessible to all. Registered users can deposit different items: articles, technical reports, Ph.D. theses, books, working papers and preprints, articles already appeared in journals, conference papers and chapters from books already published, training aid, dataset and more.

Since 2001, the  Budapest Open Access Initiative promotes the free availability or research articles in all academic fields and concerns a growing number of individuals and organizations from around the world who represent researchers, universities, laboratories, libraries, foundations, journals, publishers, learned societies, and kindred open-access initiatives.

References

External links
BOAI  http://www.soros.org/openaccess/index.shtml 
ERC – European Research Council http://erc.europa.eu/pdf/ScC_Guidelines_Open_Access_revised_Dec07_FINAL.pdf 
EUA – European University Association http://www.eua.be/fileadmin/user_upload/files/Policy_Positions/Recommendations_Open_Access_adopted_by_the_EUA_Council_on_26th_of_March_2008_final.pdf 
Open Access Week http://openaccessweek.org/
Open Archives Initiative 
OpenDOAR http://www.opendoar.org/
OpenRoar CRUI https://web.archive.org/web/20121030222530/http://roar.eprints.org/

Academic publishing
Italian digital libraries
Archival science